The Sistema Estatal de Radio y Televisión (SERTV, "State Radio and Television System"), is the public broadcaster of Panama. It operates three radio networks and the Sertv national television network, broadcast on channel 11 in Panama City.

History 
In 1967, the Universidad de Panamá began operation of a closed circuit television station on the university campus. In 1971, the station began to take programming from the new Radio y Televisión Educativa, and the operation moved to new facilities in 1975.

In 1977, work began to bring the station to broadcast television, as "Canal Once Telexperimental". The first channel 11 signal went to air on January 22, 1978, and the station received final approval to operate channel 11 in 1980. The name of "Canal 11" was replaced with "RTE" (not to be confused with the Irish broadcaster) after the end of military governance, and later "RTVE". During this time period it added transmitters in other areas of the country and expanded its radio operations.

In 2004, RTVE was restructured as the Sistema Estatal de Radio y Televisión, with improved studios and programming.

In 2010, SERTV became the first station to broadcast in the DVB-T format in Panama.

Programming 
Current programming is totally different as used to be in the 80s, with new studios; news, interviews and TV shows are produced locally. These shows are called "Non Toxic Programming" (Produccion No Toxica) and the most important are:
 Recordar es Vivir     (old music video clip show) 
 El Poder de la Timba  (local musicians show) 
 Sala 11               (movies review show) 
 Sertv Noticias        (local news)

Special Programs
 Mi Cancion
 Sabores de Mi Barrio

Radio Stations
Sertv also operates 3 radio stations:
 Nacional FM
 Crisol FM
 Radio Nacional de Panamá (AM)
 Radio Panamá Internacional (online stream)

References 

Television stations in Panama
Television channels and stations established in 1980
Mass media in Panama City